Catherine Scott (born 27 August 1973 in Clarendon Parish) is a retired Jamaican athlete who specialized in the 400 metres hurdles. She also competed on the successful Jamaican team in the 4 x 400 metres relay, winning an Olympic silver medal in 2000. she is the sister of Michael Blackwood.

Achievements

Personal bests
400 metres - 51.65 s (2000)
400 metres hurdles - 54.93 s (2000)

External links

1973 births
Living people
Jamaican female hurdlers
Jamaican female sprinters
Athletes (track and field) at the 1992 Summer Olympics
Athletes (track and field) at the 1996 Summer Olympics
Athletes (track and field) at the 2000 Summer Olympics
Olympic athletes of Jamaica
Olympic silver medalists for Jamaica
World Athletics Championships medalists
People from Clarendon Parish, Jamaica
Olympic silver medalists in athletics (track and field)
Goodwill Games medalists in athletics
World Athletics Indoor Championships medalists
World Athletics Championships winners
Medalists at the 2000 Summer Olympics
Competitors at the 2001 Goodwill Games